Biel House is a historic house on the Biel Estate near Stenton, East Lothian, Scotland. It is a Category A listed building.

House
The present Biel House dates from the 16th century, is statutorily listed, and is a castellated three-storey building. It was formerly owned by the Earls of Belhaven. William Atkinson extended it between 1814 and 1818, and early in the 20th century further alterations of the interior were made by R. R. Anderson.

James VI came to Biel and Ormiston to hunt in October 1599.

Grounds
The grounds of Biel House have many interesting features:
Biel Water which flows through the estate, past Biel Mill
A range of buildings, including a chapel, doocot, summerhouse, a bridge, gate piers and glasshouses
Deer park, kitchen garden, rock garden, gull pond, and extensive woodland

See also
Bilsdean
Biel Water
List of places in East Lothian

References

Country houses in East Lothian
History of East Lothian
Inventory of Gardens and Designed Landscapes
Category A listed buildings in East Lothian